Pani patti is an alternate accent/style of reciting the Quran, compared with the traditional Arabic or Egyptian accent. Pani patti accent is specific to India and Pakistan and is limited in the sub-continent region only. Although, even in the sub-continent it is not as popular as the traditional style of recitation.

Verses of the Quran are recited in homogeneous tone with a little variation. The graph of tone, in every verse, rises after the start, then keeps its typical melody for a while, and falls symmetrically at the end. This style of recitation is considered to be very rhythmic and melodic.

It is supposed to have been originated in the region of Panipat in India. In Pakistan, there are many madrassas in Multan and Faisalabad that teach pani patti.

Schools
 Qari Altaf, Jamia Masjid Khulfia-e-Rashdeen, G-9/2 Islamabad
 Masjid Rana Market F-7, Islamabad
 Jamia Faredia, Islamabad
 Darul Uloom Ashab-e-Suffah Asif Town Jauharabad(Khushab).
 Jamia Darul Quran, Muslim Town, Faisalabad 
 Jamia Zia ul Quran(Bagh Wali Masjid), Model Town, Faisalabad
 Jamia Rahimiya Faiz-e-Aam, mehrabadi , G-11 , Islamabad. 

Quran reciting